The 2013 Generali Ladies Linz was a tennis tournament played on indoor hard courts. It was the 27th edition of the Generali Ladies Linz, and part of the WTA International tournaments-category of the 2013 WTA Tour. It was held at the TipsArena Linz in Linz, Austria, on 7–13 October 2013.

Singles entrants

Seeds 

 Rankings as of 30 September 2013

Other entrants 
The following players received wildcards into the singles main draw:
  Angelique Kerber 
  Melanie Klaffner 
  Patricia Mayr-Achleitner

The following players received entry from the qualifying draw:
  Camila Giorgi
  Aleksandra Krunić 
  Katarzyna Piter 
  Kristýna Plíšková

The following player received entry into the singles main draw as a lucky loser:
  Maryna Zanevska

Withdrawals 
Before the tournament
  Alizé Cornet
  Simona Halep
  Petra Kvitová

Doubles entrants

Seeds 

1 Rankings as of 30 September 2013

Other entrants 
The following pairs received wildcards into the doubles main draw:
  Annika Beck /  Sandra Klemenschits 
  Lisa-Maria Moser /  Nicole Rottmann

Champions

Singles 

  Angelique Kerber def.  Ana Ivanovic 6–4, 7–6(8–6)

Doubles 

  Karolína Plíšková /  Kristýna Plíšková def.  Gabriela Dabrowski /  Alicja Rosolska 7–6(8–6), 6–4

External links 
 

2013 WTA Tour
2013
Generali Ladies Linz
October 2013 sports events in Europe
Generali